Mu'in Tawfiq Bseiso (1926 – January 23, 1984) was a Palestinian poet who lived in Egypt, where he first entered the world of poetry.  He finished his primary and secondary education in Gaza in 1948. He started publishing his work in the Jaffa-based magazine Al-Hurriya (translated: Liberty), where he published his first poems in 1946. Two years later, in 1948, he enrolled in the American University in Cairo and subsequently graduated in 1952. His dissertation was titled "The Spoken or Head Word in Lower Eastern Broadcast Media", discussing the borders between radio and TV on one hand and the printed newspaper media on the other. He became involved with democratic and national work early on in his life, and later dedicated himself to poetry and teaching. On January 27, 1952, he published his first work titled Al-Ma'raka (translated: The Battle). He  published several other volumes of poetry: Palestine in the Heart, (1964), Trees Die Standing (1966). He was imprisoned in Egyptian jails in Gaza twice: 1955 to 1957 and 1959 to 1963. In one of them he met his future wife, Sahbaa al-Barbari, one of the first women communists in Gaza. He lived in exile after the Israeli conquest of the Gaza Strip in the 1967 Six-Day War. He died due to heart failure in London in 1984. His family was denied permission by Israel to have his remains buried in Gaza.

Significant achievements 
His works have been translated into English, French, German, Russian, Azeri, Uzbek, Italian, Spanish, Japanese, Vietnamese, and Persian. Mu'in Bseiso was awarded the Afro-Asian Lotus Prize for Literature and was the vice Editor in Chief of the Lotus magazine issued by the Afro-Asian Writers' Association. Additionally, he was the recipient of the Palestinian Dir' Al-Thawra (translated: Revolution Shield).

References 

 

1926 births
1984 deaths
Palestinian male poets
People from Gaza City
20th-century Palestinian poets
20th-century male writers